Domilise's Po-Boy and Bar is an uptown New Orleans restaurant known for its po-boy sandwiches.  The restaurant was founded in the 1930s by the Domilise family, who lived in the house above the single-room bar/dining area, and was run by Sam and Dorothy “Miss Dot” Domilise  for over seventy-five years until her death in 2013.
The restaurant was closed during 2005's Hurricane Katrina while the family evacuated to Alabama and to Franklin, Louisiana.

The interior of the restaurant features photos of famous visitors, memorabilia, and has a bar in addition to the six tables.
The restaurant has been featured in many cooking shows and guide books, such as Adam Richman's Best Sandwich in America, Sandwiches That You Will Like, Food Wars, and Chowdown Countdown. On Best Sandwich in America, Domilise's fried shrimp po-boy was named the best sandwich on the Gulf Coast.

References 

Restaurants in New Orleans